Gente (English: People) is an Italian-language song recorded by Laura Pausini and written by Cheope, Marco Marati and Angelo Valsiglio. It was released in 1994 as the second single from Pausini's second album, Laura.  The song bears a striking resemblance to the Marco Ferradini song "Teorema."

A Spanish-language version of the song was published by Pausini in her 1994's album Laura Pausini. Both versions of the song were re-recorded with a new arrangement by Celso Valli for Pausini's first greatest hits album, The Best of Laura Pausini: E ritorno da te / Lo mejor de Laura Pausini: Volveré junto a ti and later would be re-recordered with a new arrangement for Pausini's second greatest hits album, 20 - The Greatest Hits / 20 - Grandes Éxitos.

Track listings

Covers
The Italian-language version of the song was covered in 1995 by Brazilian singer Renato Russo and included in his album Equilíbrio distante.

Charts

Weekly charts

Italian version

Spanish version

Year-end charts

Spanish version

See also
 List of number-one Billboard Hot Latin Pop Airplay of 1995

References

Laura Pausini songs
1994 songs
Italian-language songs
Spanish-language songs
Songs written by Cheope
Songs written by Angelo Valsiglio
Compagnia Generale del Disco singles